The Sunday Express was an English-language weekly newspaper published in Montreal.

Foundation
The paper was published by Midnight founder Joe Azaria, who also tried without success to turn the paper into a daily, under the name Daily Express. That experiment lasted less than a year, as the paper was unable to compete with the then-dominant Montreal Star and the second place Montreal Gazette (now Montreal's only English daily).

Acquisition and closure by Quebecor
In 1974, the Sunday Express was acquired by Quebecor, which ran it until closing the paper in 1985.

Notable contributors
Contributors included Antonia Zerbisias, who briefly worked there at the start of her career,  as well as drama critic turned theatre director Marianne Ackerman and Andy Nulman, who wrote an entertainment column for the paper.
Canadian novelist, Kim Echlin, wrote for the paper while she was a student at McGill. Mike Cohen, presently the head of communications at the English Montreal School Board, columnist for The Suburban and a city councillor in Côte Saint-Luc, was the assistant sports editor from 1981 to 1985.

See also
List of newspapers in Canada

Defunct newspapers published in Quebec
Defunct weekly newspapers
Newspapers published in Montreal
Publications disestablished in 1985
Publications with year of establishment missing
Weekly newspapers published in Quebec
English-language newspapers published in Quebec
1985 disestablishments in Quebec